The Ministry of Majority Welfare Development is a Ministry of the Government of Maharashtra State.

The Ministry is headed by a cabinet level Minister. Eknath Shinde is Current Minister of Majority Welfare Development and Chief Minister Government of Maharashtra.

Head office

List of Cabinet Ministers

List of Ministers of State

References 

Government of Maharashtra
Government ministries of Maharashtra